Kotij is a suburb of Sangli District in the Indian state of Maharashtra.

Demographics 

Kotij is a simple and small village established in 1700-1760,by a group of 25-30 Sunni Muslims (musalmaan) originated from India. They created a base of Kotij, invited peoples from nearby places who have no homes or a native place for living, and they give those peoples land for farming. Also there is a dargah which is represents the love of brother and sister named hajarat miyasaheb mamulabi dargah (reference from-helavi register of village establishment in modi lipi)
also there is a story that is "Kotij is a new name of the village Kuntij. According to the history in Mahabharatha Kunti came here and halted for a night and they created a whole temple in one night and thereafter the name Kuntij was given. Later after years it changed to Kotij." but this have no valid proof because of that this is not valid fact.

Kotij is a small village located in Kadegaon Taluka of Sangli district, Maharashtra with total 273 families residing. The Kotij village has population of 1182 of which 572 are males while 610 are females as per Population Census 2011

In Kotij village population of children with age 0-6 is 111 which makes up 9.39% of total population of village. Average Sex Ratio of Kotij village is 1066 which is higher than Maharashtra state average of 929. Child sex ratio for the Kotij as per census is 790, lower than Maharashtra average of 894.

It belongs to Desh or Paschim Maharashtra region. It belongs to Pune Division. It is located 67 km towards North from District headquarters Sangli. 15 km from Kadegaon. 291 km from state capital Mumbai.

Kherade Wangi (2 km), Yetgaon (2 km), Kanharwadi (6 km), Hanamantvadiye (6 km), Tondoli (7 km) are the nearby villages to Kotij. Kotij is surrounded by Karad Taluka towards the west, Palus Taluka on the south, Khanapur-Vita Taluka towards east, and Khatav Taluka towards north.

Mahuli, Vita, Karad, Uran Islampur are the nearby cities to Kotij.

Education 

A government school is there in the bus stand where 5th standard is the highest class. Later students have to go to Bharati Vidyapeeth High School and College within 1 km.

Bharati Vidyapeeth which was established in 1993 gave the students of Kotij higher education. It was started by Patangrao Kadam.

References 
 Census2011

External links 
 Google Map
 Bharathi Vidyapeeth College 

Villages in Sangli district